Abbazia di San Martino in Valle (Italian for Abbey of San Martino in Valle)  is a  medieval abbey in Fara San Martino, Province of Chieti (Abruzzo).

History

Architecture

References

External links

Martino in Valle
Fara San Martino